Florian Stefan Kehrmann (born 26 June 1977 in Neuss) is a former German handball player and current coach for TBV Lemgo.

Kehrmann has played for TUSEM Essen from 1994 until 1995 and for Sportring Solingen from 1995 until 1999. Since 1999, he has been part of TBV Lemgo, where he won the National Cup of Germany in 2002, the National Championship of Germany in 2003 and the EHF Cup in 2006. In 2014, he became the coach.

Kehrmann was a member of the German national handball team. He was the German handball player of the year in 2003, 2005 and 2006, he has won the 2004 European Men's Handball Championship and the 2007 World Men's Handball Championship.

He competed at the 2000, 2004, and 2008 Summer Olympics.

He married his wife Diana in 2006. His first son Len Farell was born on 25 March 2007.

References

External links 
  
 
 
 

1977 births
Living people
German male handball players
Olympic handball players of Germany
Olympic silver medalists for Germany
Olympic medalists in handball
Handball players at the 2000 Summer Olympics
Handball players at the 2004 Summer Olympics
Handball players at the 2008 Summer Olympics
Medalists at the 2004 Summer Olympics
Sportspeople from Neuss
20th-century German people